Deerfield is one of two Metra commuter railroad stations in Deerfield, Illinois along the Milwaukee District North Line. The station serves commuters between Union Station and Fox Lake, Illinois. As of 2018, Deerfield is the 39th busiest of Metra's 236 non-downtown stations, with an average of 1,133 weekday boardings. The current station originally served the Chicago, Milwaukee, St. Paul & Pacific Railroad, and replaced two older stations built by the railway.

As of December 12, 2022, Deerfield is served by 50 trains (24 inbound, all 26 outbound) on weekdays, by all 20 trains (10 in each direction) on Saturdays, and by all 18 trains (nine in each direction) on Sundays and holidays. On weekdays, two inbound trains originate here, and two outbound trains terminate here.

The commuter parking lot east of the station and tracks is the site of the Deerfield Farmer's Market, Saturday Mornings from June to October.

History 
The first train station in Deerfield was a temporary boxcar installed by the Milwaukee Road in 1872. Situated on Central Avenue, then called Hall Avenue, it was used as a temporary station while a permanent station was being constructed. The replacement structure was built about 2 blocks to the south of the current station and opened in 1872. The present station, which replaced both previous stations, was built in 1903 after a petition was circulated to have a train station closer to the center of the village. Architect Jay W. Nettenstrom designed the station using American Craftsman and Prairie-style principles. The station is similar in design to other stations along the Milwaukee Road, including the station in Walworth, Wisconsin.

In 1913, an underpass was built to the south of the station to allow Deerfield Road to flow under the tracks. The station caught on fire in 1917 with only the freight room surviving. The building was repaired and enlarged according to a new plan by architect Charles Rawson. The current station was built on the foundation of the 1903 station, and retains many features from when it was rebuilt after the fire, including historical double-hung windows and radiators.

In 1973, the Milwaukee Road had planned to tear down the station, along with five other stations in Northeastern Illinois, and replace it with a concrete shelter. This plan, though, was shelved in favor of a restoration due to public outcry. The Deerfield Area Historical Society created a plan to repair and rehab the station to prevent demolition. In 1974, the Village of Deerfield received $65,000 in federal funds to restore the station. The local Jaycees volunteered to paint and restore the station.

The station was added to the National Register of Historic Places on February 5, 1998.

No Kissing Zone 
Deerfield station became nationally famous in 1979, when Deerfield village officials created a "No-Kissing Zone" at the station in response to complaints about traffic jams caused by couples taking too long to kiss their goodbyes at the drop-off point. The "No-Kissing" signs (patterned after international traffic signs) attracted national attention and were featured in Time magazine and ABC's AM America (precursor to Good Morning America). A Deerfield family appearing on the game show Family Feud presented Richard Dawson with replica pins of the signs. Despite this restriction, the station is shown in the 1983 Paul Brickman film Risky Business.

Bus connections
Pace
  471 Highland Park – Northbrook Court
632 Shuttle Bug 2 (service to Baxter International headquarters and offices in Parkway North)

Route 632 is currently suspended due to the COVID-19 pandemic.

References

External links

Dynamic Depot Maps image
Station from Google Maps Street View

Metra stations in Illinois
National Register of Historic Places in Lake County, Illinois
Railway stations in the United States opened in 1872
Railway stations on the National Register of Historic Places in Illinois
Former Chicago, Milwaukee, St. Paul and Pacific Railroad stations
Deerfield, Illinois
Railway stations in Lake County, Illinois
1872 establishments in Illinois